Parapinnixa is a genus of crab in the family Pinnotheridae. Originally described by Samuel Jackson Holmes as Pseudopinnixa, he published the replacement name Parapinnixa the following year, after learning of the senior homonym Pseudopinnixa Ortmann, 1894.

The genus contains the following species:
Parapinnixa affinis Holmes, 1900 – California Bay pea crab
Parapinnixa beaufortensis Rathbun, 1918
Parapinnixa bouvieri Rathbun, 1918
Parapinnixa cortesi Thoma, Heard & Vargas, 2005
Parapinnixa cubana Campos, 1994
Parapinnixa glasselli Garth, 1939
Parapinnixa hendersoni Rathbun, 1918
Parapinnixa magdalenensis Werding & Müller, 1990
Parapinnixa nitida (Lockington, 1876)

References

Pinnotheroidea
Taxonomy articles created by Polbot